Brigadier General Paul Aloysius Kenna, VC, DSO (16 August 1862 – 30 August 1915) was an English-born British Army officer of Irish descent and recipient of the Victoria Cross (VC), the highest and most prestigious award for gallantry in the face of the enemy that could be awarded to British and British Empire forces. He also competed at the 1912 Summer Olympics.

Background
He was the son of James Kenna, of Liverpool, who was descended from a family of minor gentry from County Meath. Kenna was educated at St. Augustine's College in Ramsgate, Stonyhurst College and St. Francis Xavier College in Liverpool - he is honoured in a memorial which can be seen in the main hall of the current college site in Beaconsfield Road, Liverpool and by a plaque and a portrait at Stonyhurst.

Military service and Victoria Cross
Kenna was commissioned into the British Army as a lieutenant in the 21st Lancers (Empress of India's) on 25 August 1886, and promoted to captain on 12 July 1895.

He was 36 years old, serving as a captain in the 21st Lancers during the Mahdist War when the following deed took place for which he was awarded the VC:

On 2 September 1898, at the Battle of Omdurman, Sudan, when a major of the 21st Lancers was in danger, as his horse had been shot in the charge, Captain Kenna took the major up on his own horse, to a place of safety. After the charge Captain Kenna returned to help Lieutenant De Montmorency who was trying to recover the body of an officer who had been killed.

He later served in the Second Boer War in South Africa 1899–1900, and was promoted a brevet major on 29 November 1900. For his service during the war, he was appointed a Companion of the Distinguished Service Order (DSO) in the South Africa Honours list published on 26 June 1902. Following the end of the war that month Kenna returned to the United Kingdom in the RMS Dunottar Castle, which arrived at Southampton in July 1902. He received the substantive rank of major on 7 September 1902, on his appointment to lead a Mounted infantry flying column in Somaliland. He arrived there to take part in the 1903 Somaliland campaign, which ended in British retreat. In September 1910 he retired with the rank of Colonel from the Regular Army but in April 1912 was appointed to command the Notts and Derby (Yeomanry) Mounted Brigade and on the outbreak of war was appointed Brigadier-General.

Olympics
He competed in the 1912 Summer Olympics for Great Britain as a horse rider. He did not finish the Individual eventing (Military) competition, also the British team did not finish the team event. In the individual jumping event he finished 27th.

World War I
He was killed in action at Suvla, Turkey during the Battle of Gallipoli on 30 August 1915, aged 53 and is buried in Lala Baba Cemetery.

His VC is on display in The Royal Lancers and Nottinghamshire Yeomanry Museum in Thoresby Park, Nottinghamshire.

Family
Kenna married Lady Cecil Bertie, daughter of the 7th Earl of Abingdon.  He married, secondly, Angela Mary, daughter of Herbert Hibbert.  They had one daughter, Kathleen (died 1998) 

His first cousin, Margaret (née) Larkin (granddaughter of his grandfather Patrick Kenna) married Simon Mangan, HM Lieutenant for Co. Meath.  Their grandson was Group Captain Nicolas Tindal-Carill-Worsley.

See also
 List of Olympians killed in World War I

References

Bibliography

1862 births
1915 deaths
British Army cavalry generals of World War I
British Army personnel of the Mahdist War
British Army personnel of the Second Boer War
British Army recipients of the Victoria Cross
British event riders
British male equestrians
British military personnel killed in World War I
British military personnel of the Third Somaliland Expedition
British recipients of the Victoria Cross
British show jumping riders
Companions of the Distinguished Service Order
English people of Irish descent
Equestrians at the 1912 Summer Olympics
Olympic equestrians of Great Britain
People educated at Stonyhurst College
Victoria Cross awardees from Liverpool
Burials at Lala Baba Commonwealth War Graves Commission Cemetery
British Army brigadiers